The University of South Carolina Beaufort (USCB or USC Beaufort) is a public university with three campuses located in the Lowcountry region of South Carolina. It is part of the University of South Carolina System and enrolls about 1,900 students. The main campus is in Bluffton, South Carolina. The campus offers over 20 programs of study. The institution's campus in Beaufort houses the school's honor programs and the Department of Visual Arts & Design. The campus location on Hilton Head Island is home to the school's program for hospitality management.

History
In 1795, a preparatory school and college in Beaufort was chartered as the Beaufort College to serve the families of local residents. Classes began in 1802, and the college reached a prominent status in the community during the antebellum period. The college was forced to close in 1861 at the beginning of the Civil War and the Beaufort College building, constructed in 1852, was occupied by the Union forces for use as a hospital.

The college building was used by the Freedmen's Bureau during Reconstruction, and it was an elementary school from 1909 to 1959. In the 1950s, two factors brought about the return of higher education to the Beaufort region. The University of South Carolina sought to expand its reach throughout the state by the establishment of extension campuses and the Beaufort County Higher Education Commission was formed by citizens of Beaufort to bring a campus to the area. A branch campus of the University of South Carolina was established in 1959 at the site of the old Beaufort College, but the official opening was delayed by Hurricane Gracie.

The campus experienced steady growth through the years, and it expanded south along Carteret Street. In 2002, the campus was upgraded from a regional campus to a senior campus offering bachelor's degrees. USCB opened a second,  campus with housing in Bluffton. In 2004, it also began offering programs for the United States Marine Corps on Parris Island, South Carolina. In 2018, the institution opened its third campus, located on Hilton Head Island, to house the program for hospitality management.

Academics
USCB is one of the three senior campuses in the University of South Carolina system and is a Southern Association of Colleges and Schools accredited four-year university. It offers the bachelor's degree in human services online through Palmetto College.

USCB offers the region's only human services degree as well as more traditional degrees like English, psychology, business, and education. The school opened a nursing facility in Spring 2009. Human simulators provide nursing students hands-on training opportunities. Another popular program capitalizing on nearby Hilton Head Island resorts is the hospitality management program, which draws international students and provides internships. The biology program allows students to explore and study first-hand the continental-shelf and estuarine environment with a concentration in coastal ecology and conservation.

Student life
The university has 1,875 undergraduate students. The gender makeup of the student body is 66 percent female and 33 percent male. The racial makeup of the student body is 72 percent white, 10 percent African-American, and 18 percent other.

Student organizations
USCB offers numerous student organizations, including several special interest clubs, religious groups, honor societies, and academic clubs. The campuses largest organization Student Government Association, consisting of twelve student senators, a vice president, President, and an executive board.

Greek life
USCB recognizes five chapters of national fraternities and sororities. The sole fraternity on campus is Kappa Alpha Psi. Sororities include Alpha Kappa Alpha, Zeta Phi Beta, Phi Mu, and Zeta Tau Alpha. Fraternities and sororities are housed within the residential dorms.

Athletics 

The South Carolina–Beaufort (USC Beaufort or USCB) athletic teams are called the Sand Sharks. The university is a member of both the National Association of Intercollegiate Athletics (NAIA) and the National Collegiate Athletic Association (NCAA) at the Division II ranks, primarily competing in the NCAA's Peach Belt Conference (PBC) and the NAIA's Continental Athletic Conference, formerly known as the Association of Independent Institutions (AII), for the 2022–23 school year only (which they were a member on a previous stint during the 2007–08 school year, which when the school began its athletics program and joined the NAIA). The Sand Sharks previously competed in the Sun Conference, formerly known as the Florida Sun Conference (FSC), from 2008–09 to 2021–22.

USC Beaufort competes in 11 intercollegiate varsity sports: Men's sports include baseball, cross country, golf and track & field (indoor and outdoor); while women's sports include cross country, golf, soccer, softball and track & field (indoor and outdoor).

Facilities
Both the Sand Sharks baseball and softball teams practice and play home games at the City of Hardeeville's Recreation Complex (The Richard Gray Baseball Complex).

Move to NCAA Division II
On April 14, 2021, the university's athletic department announced its intention to pursue an NCAA Division II and join the Peach Belt Conference (PBC) in that division starting in the fall of 2022. Men's and women's basketball will be added to the scholarship sports as a condition of its NCAA and Peach Belt memberships, and USC Beaufort intended for the teams in that sport to start their first season in 2023–24. By July 15, 2022, USCB was already accepted into the Continental Athletic Conference for its first year of provisional membership while still playing a Peach Belt schedule as part of the Sand Sharks' NAIA-NCAA dual membership, but will be ineligible for a Peach Belt or NCAA postseason during the three-year transition.

Housing

Palmetto Village
Palmetto Village is located on USCB's Bluffton campus. The school offers apartment style housing, with each dorm consisting of four bedrooms, two bathrooms, and a kitchen and dining area. There are ten dorms on campus, including five freshmen dorms.

Notable alumni 

 William Elliot, American attorney and former member of the U.S. House of Representatives
 Shannon Erickson, current member of South Carolina House of Representatives
 Robert Rhett, former U.S. Senator
 Robert Woodward Barnwell, former U.S. Senator

References

External links
 
 Official athletics website

 
University of South Carolina Beaufort
Universities and colleges accredited by the Southern Association of Colleges and Schools
Education in Beaufort County, South Carolina
Buildings and structures in Beaufort County, South Carolina
Buildings and structures in Beaufort, South Carolina
Educational institutions established in 1959
1959 establishments in South Carolina